The fire departments in Delaware are members of the Delaware Volunteer Firemen's Association, with the exception of the fire brigades and airport fire departments. The City of Wilmington fire department is an associate member.

New Castle County

Originally organized as "Volunteer Fire Company" on March 17, 1887 and later underwent a name change to "Delaware City Hose Company" on January 23, 1889. There was a disrupted period of inactivity where there was no organized fire company and the Delaware City Fire Company was reorganized on July 9, 1924, however, the company uses the initial date of organization for the previous company in 1887.
Originally organized as the "Minquas Civic Association and Fire Company" and later changed their name to "Minquadale Fire Company, Inc." in 1929 to avoid confusion with Minquas of Newport.
Originally organized as "Nonesuch Fire Company" and changed their name one month later to "Minquas Fire Company."
Originally organized as "Augustine Beach Fire Company" and changed their name on December 3, 1957 to "Port Penn Volunteer Fire Company."

Kent County

Sussex County 

 Lewes Station 3 and Rehoboth Beach Station 3 is a joint station housing apparatus from both fire departments in the same building on John J. Williams Highway in Angola.

Defunct

References

Delaware